EgyptAir Flight 804 was a regularly scheduled international passenger flight from Paris Charles de Gaulle Airport to Cairo International Airport, operated by EgyptAir. On 19 May 2016 at 02:33Egypt Standard Time (UTC+2), the Airbus A320 crashed into the Mediterranean Sea, killing all 56 passengers, 3 security personnel, and 7 crew members on board.

No mayday call was received by air traffic control, although signals that smoke had been detected in one of the aircraft's lavatories and in the avionics bay were automatically transmitted via ACARS shortly before the aircraft disappeared from radar. The last communications from the aircraft prior to its submersion were two transmissions from its emergency locator transmitter that were received by the International Cospas-Sarsat Programme. Nearly four weeks after the crash, several main sections of wreckage were identified on the seabed, and both flight recorders were recovered in a multinational search and recovery operation. On 29 June, Egyptian officials announced that the flight data recorder data indicated smoke in the aircraft, and that soot plus damage from high temperatures was found on some of the wreckage from the front section of the aircraft.

In August 2016, French foreign minister Jean-Marc Ayrault criticized the fact that no further explanation for the reasons behind the crash had been given. In December 2016, Egyptian officials said traces of explosives were found on the bodies but in May 2017, French officials denied that. On 6 July 2018, France's BEA stated that the most likely hypothesis was a fire in the cockpit that spread rapidly.

A manslaughter investigation was started in France in June 2016; in April 2019, a report commissioned as part of the investigation stated the aircraft was not airworthy and should have never taken-off: recurring defects had not been reported by the crews, including alerts reporting potential fire hazards. In April 2022, it was reported that the fire was caused by one of the pilots smoking a cigarette, which burned out of control when exposed to oxygen leaking from a cockpit oxygen mask.

Aircraft
The aircraft involved was an Airbus A320-232, registration SU-GCC, MSN 2088, powered by two IAE V2527-A5 engines. It made its first flight on 25 July 2003, and was delivered to EgyptAir on 3 November 2003.

The flight was the aircraft's fifth that day, having flown from Asmara International Airport, Eritrea, to Cairo; then from Cairo to Tunis–Carthage International Airport, Tunisia, and back. The last completed flight of the aircraft, before its ultimate crash, was Flight 803 to Paris Charles de Gaulle Airport.

Flight

The aircraft departed for Cairo International Airport from Charles de Gaulle Airport on 18 May 2016 at 23:09 (all times refer to UTC+2, used in France and Egypt at the time). The aircraft crashed into the sea around 2:33, when the last ACARS message was sent. The flight had lasted 3 hours 25 minutes.

The aircraft was due to land at 03:05. It was originally reported that a distress signal from emergency devices was detected by the Egyptian military at 04:26, two hours after the last radar contact; officials later retracted this statement.

This information was rejected on 23 May by an Egyptian official from the National Air Navigation Services Company, who stated that there was no change in altitude and no unusual movement before the aircraft disappeared from radar. It is possible that Egyptian radars were unable to track the aircraft as accurately as Greek radars due to their distance from the aircraft. On 14 June, Egyptian authorities confirmed the statements made by Greek officials. According to a former investigator, the initial left turn could have exceeded computer-controlled flight protections, and might also have come close to or exceeded the structural design limits of the aircraft.

Passengers and crew
The 66 passengers and crew all died. They collectively held citizenship in 13 different countries.

Fifty-six passengers from twelve different countries were on board. Three passengers were reported to be children, including two infants. Some of the passengers held multiple citizenship.

The crew of ten consisted of two pilots, five flight attendants, and three security personnel. According to EgyptAir, captain Mohammed Shoqeir had 6,275 hours of flying experience, including 2,101 hours on the A320, while first officer Mohamed Assem had 2,766 hours.

Search and recovery efforts

Initial efforts

The Egyptian Civil Aviation Ministry confirmed that search and rescue teams were deployed to look for the missing aircraft. Search efforts were carried out in coordination with Greek authorities. A spokesman for the Egyptian Civil Aviation Agency stated that the aircraft most likely crashed into the sea. Greece and France sent aircraft and naval ships to the area to participate in search and rescue efforts. The United Kingdom sent a naval ship, while the United States sent a naval aircraft.

Search area

An emergency locator transmitter usually activates at impact to send a radio distress signal; this is not the signal from an underwater locator beacon (ULB) attached to a flight recorder, which is an ultrasonic pulse. The U.S. National Oceanic and Atmospheric Administration confirmed that the emergency locator transmitter signal was received by satellites minutes after the airliner disappeared from radar. A "distress signal" received two hours after the disappearance of the aircraft, possibly originating from the emergency locator transmitter, had been reported already on 19 May; this report was denied by EgyptAir.

At the beginning of June, after ultrasonic pulses from a ULB of one of the flight recorders had been detected, a "priority search area"  in radius was established.

Capable of retrieving the flight recorders from the seabed, it left the Irish Sea on 28 May and, at that time, it was expected to arrive at the search area around 9 June, after stopping in the Egyptian Port of Alexandria to board Egyptian and French investigators. The vessel was delayed, arriving in Alexandria on 9 June and at the search area some time on or before 13 June. On 15 June, Egyptian authorities announced that searchers on board the John Lethbridge had identified several main sections of wreckage on the seabed. On 9 July, the Egyptian government reported it was extending the John Lethbridges stay at the crash site, to 18 July. The John Lethbridge concluded its mission to recover human remains and returned to the port of Alexandria on 16 July. On arrival, the recovered remains were transferred from the John Lethbridge to Egypt's Department of Forensic Medicine in Cairo for DNA analysis and processing.

Flight recorders
On 22 May, an Egyptian remotely operated underwater vehicle (ROV), owned by the country's Oil Ministry, was deployed to join the search for the missing aircraft. According to Egypt's chief investigator with the Civil Aviation Ministry, Ayman al-Moqadem, the ROV cannot detect signals from flight recorders.

A French Navy D'Estienne d'Orves-class aviso ship, the Enseigne de vaisseau Jacoubet, equipped with sonar able to detect the underwater "pings" emitted by the ULBs of the flight recorders, arrived at the possible crash site on 23 May.

On 26 May, Italian and French companies capable of executing deep-sea searches, including ALSEAMAR and the Mauritius-based Deep Ocean Search, were asked by Egypt to help locate the flight recorders.

A more specialized French Navy ship, the oceanographic research ship Laplace, left the Corsican port of Porto-Vecchio for the search area on 27 May, according to French aircraft accident investigation body the Bureau of Enquiry and Analysis for Civil Aviation Safety (BEA). On 1 June, the Egyptian Civil Aviation Ministry reported that "pings" from a ULB of one of the flight recorders had been detected by the Laplace. This was confirmed by the BEA whose spokesperson announced the establishment of a "priority search area".

The survey ship John Lethbridge was at the search area by 13 June. The ULBs, which were activated on 19 May, are designed to last for at least 30 days; the Egyptian board of inquiry said the signals would continue until 24 June. The memory unit was retrieved intact and sent to Cairo for investigation, following the transfer of the CVR to Egyptian civil aviation officials in Alexandria. The next day it was announced that the John Lethbridge had been used to retrieve, in several pieces, the second flight recorder—the flight data recorder (FDR). The memory unit was recovered from the damaged flight data recorder but an Egyptian official stated that the flight recorders require extensive repair before they could be properly analyzed and accessed.

On 19 June, Egypt's Aircraft Accident Investigation Committee announced that they, with the assistance of the Egyptian Armed Forces, had completed the drying procedure of the intact memory modules and started electrical testing of the memory modules from both the cockpit voice recorder and the flight data recorder.

On 21 June, officials involved in the investigation disclosed that the memory chips from both recorders were damaged. After the initial attempts to download data from both recorders failed, the Egyptian investigative committee announced on 23 June that both recorders would be sent to France's BEA to have salt deposits from the memory chips removed; the recorders would then be returned to Egypt for analysis.

On 27 June, the BEA announced that the FDR had been repaired and sent back to Cairo for data analysis by civil aviation safety authorities.

Early responses
Initially, the disappearance and crash of Flight 804 was assumed to be linked to terrorism and insurgency in the region. Thus, for instance, the Egyptian Civil Aviation Ministry stated on 19 May that Flight 804 was probably attacked. Two US officials believed the aircraft was downed by a bomb, and a senior official said that monitoring equipment focused on the area at the time detected evidence of an explosion on board the aircraft; other officials from multiple US agencies said they had seen no evidence of an explosion in satellite imagery and another two intelligence officials stated there is nothing yet to indicate foul play.

Investigation
According to Greek military radar data, Flight 804 veered off course shortly after entering the Egyptian flight information region. This information was later denied on 23 May by an Egyptian official from the National Air Navigation Services Company, who stated there was no change in altitude and no unusual movement before the aircraft disappeared from radar. On 14 June, Egyptian authorities confirmed the statements made by Greek officials.

Shortly after the disappearance, the French government began to investigate whether there had been a security breach at Paris Charles de Gaulle Airport.

Seven messages sent via the Aircraft Communications Addressing and Reporting System (ACARS) had been received from the aircraft between 02:26 and 02:29 local time; contact was lost four minutes later at 02:33. The data, confirmed by France's Bureau of Investigations and Analysis, indicates that smoke may have been detected in the front of the airliner—in the front lavatory and the avionics bay beneath the cockpit. Smoke detectors of the type installed on the aircraft can also be triggered by the condensation of water vapour, producing fog, in the event of a sudden loss of pressure inside the cabin. The aircraft's optical smoke detectors have been deemed more reliable than older models on Airbus aircraft, as they produced fewer false warnings, but were sensitive to dust and some aerosols. The three windows mentioned in the data are cockpit windows, on the co-pilot's side. The flight control unit (FCU) is a cockpit-fitted unit that the pilot uses to enter instructions into the two flight management guidance computers (FMGC); an FCU 2 fault indicates a loss of connection between the FCU and FMGC number 2. The spoiler elevator computer number 3 (SEC 3) is one of the three computers that controls the spoilers and elevator actuators. Two pilots—one interviewed by The Daily Telegraph, the other writing for The Australian—interpreted the data as possible evidence of a bomb.

At 02:36, seven minutes after the last ACARS message and the last ADS-B transmission, two transmissions from the aircraft's Emergency Locator Transmitter (ELT) were received by the international Cospas-Sarsat system.  These transmissions indicated that they were initiated in "test" mode, suggesting either an unusual manipulation of the cockpit ELT switch, or an electrical fault in the switch's circuit.  The transmissions were received by Cospas-Sarsat's then-experimental MEOSAR system, and subsequent data collection and analyses by the Cospas-Sarsat Secretariat and engineers at France's Centre national d'études spatiales (CNES) were successfully used to calculate the likely point of impact of the flight in the Mediterranean Sea.

Aviation expert David Learmount of Flight International suggested that an electrical fire could have started in the aircraft's avionics compartment and that the aircrew may have been too distracted to communicate their distress to air traffic control.

On 22 May, the French television station M6 reported that, contrary to official statements, one of the pilots told Cairo air traffic control about smoke in the cabin, and decided to make an emergency descent. Later that day, the report was dismissed as false by the Egyptian Civil Aviation Ministry.

On 24 May, a forensics official from Egypt's investigative team said that the remains of the victims indicated an explosion on board. The head of forensics denied the claim.

At the beginning of June, France 3 and Le Parisien reported that the aircraft had performed three emergency landings in the hours before the crash—at Asmara, Tunis, and Cairo—followed by technical inspections, after ACARS messages "signalled anomalies on board shortly after takeoff from three airports". On 2 June, Safwat Musallam, EgyptAir's chairman, denied the report.

With investigations into the crash ongoing, Egyptian officials announced on 29 June that data recovered from the flight data recorder, as well as recovered wreckage from the plane, indicated that smoke had occurred on the aircraft, which matched previous information relayed by the plane's automated systems (ACARS). Egyptian Civil Aviation Ministry experts have suggested that wreckage from the front section indicates high temperature combustion. Media reported that data from the cockpit voice recorder indicated one of the pilots had tried to extinguish the fire in the cockpit before the airplane crashed. However, after these reports were released, the Egyptian Civil Aviation Authority urged "media to be cautious while issuing press releases about the accident and to only rely on official reports issued by the committee itself." Later, on 16 July, the committee confirmed that the cockpit voice recording mentioned "the existence of a fire".

On 22 July, investigators privately suggested that the aircraft might have broken up in mid-air.

On 17 September 2016, Reuters relayed a 16 September report from the French news outlet Le Figaro that French forensic investigators visiting Cairo noted traces of the explosive TNT on the aircraft debris.  According to Le Figaro'''s source, Egypt proposed a joint report with France announcing the discovery of evidence of an explosive, but France declined, alleging that Egyptian judicial authorities did not allow the French investigators "to carry out an adequate inspection to determine how the traces could have got there".

On 15 December 2016 Egyptian investigators announced that traces of explosives had been found on the victims; a source close to the French investigation expressed doubts about these findings. On 13 January 2017, French newspaper Le Parisien published an article claiming that unspecified "French authorities" believed the aircraft might have been brought down by a cockpit fire caused by an overheating phone battery; it noted parallels between the position where the co-pilot had stowed his iPad and iPhone 6S and data that suggested an accidental fire on the right-hand side of the flight deck, next to the co-pilot.

On 7 May 2017, French officials stated that no traces of explosives had been found on the bodies of the victims.

On 6 July 2018, France's BEA stated that the most likely hypothesis was a fire in the cockpit that spread rapidly.

In April 2022, a report from the investigation stated that the fire was caused by a cigarette in the cockpit which burned out of control when exposed to oxygen emitted from an oxygen mask, which was improperly set to an emergency setting; smoking in the cockpit was not prohibited at that time.

French manslaughter investigation
In June 2016, Paris prosecutor's office indicated that a preliminary investigation into the accident would begin, since no evidence of any act of terrorism had been found; the office had opened a manslaughter investigation instead.

In April 2019, a report commissioned as part of the French investigation and seen by Le Parisien stated the aircraft was not airworthy. On at least four previous flights recurring defects were not reported by the crews and the aircraft was not checked according to procedure. Some twenty alerts (visual and audible) had been made by the ECAM system the day before the flight, including alerts reporting an electrical problem that could lead to a fire. Pilots instead reset circuit breakers and cleared the messages. More alerts had been noted as far back as 1 May 2016, but were ignored by the airline.

The premises of BEA had to be searched under warrant as part of the investigation to obtain these data, and that occurred in October 2018. The BEA claimed that under international aviation law they were not responsible for supplying information to French judicial investigators. While they at first denied having data-recorder data, they later explained that automatic back-ups had retained the data after the original files had been deleted.

Crews on the flights preceding the crash told the investigators that they had not encountered any problems during their respective flights. EgyptAir's CEO Ahmed Adel also rejected the French report, citing it as "misleading."

Confidential documents released in December 2019 by The Wall Street Journal state that an oxygen leak may be responsible for fire, as well that the sound similar to the high-pressure leak was heard on the CVR before the captain declared a fire, while passengers were moving to the back of the plane.

Aftermath
EgyptAir retired the Flight 804 flight number and replaced it with Flight 802 for inbound flights from Paris to Cairo, while the outbound flight number was changed from Flight 803 to Flight 801.

 In popular culture 
The crash was featured in season 23, episode 10 of the Canadian documentary series Mayday, titled "Mystery Over the Mediterranean".

See also
List of accidents and incidents involving the Airbus A320 family
Swissair Flight 111

Notes

References

External links

Archived live updates (no longer updated) – The Guardian''
Archived live updates (no longer updated) – BBC News
EgyptAir MS 804 Paris Cairo  (Alt link at Emergency Page) – EgyptAir
Statements regarding the loss of Egyptair Flight 804  – Airbus, the manufacturer of the aircraft involved
Accident to the Airbus A320, registered SU-GCC and operated by Egyptair  and Accident to the Airbus A320, registered SU-GCC and operated by Egyptair, on 05/19/2016 in cruise off the Egyptian coast  – the French Bureau of Investigation and Analysis for Civil Aviation Safety
 Press releases – Egyptian Ministry of Civil Aviation

2016 in Egypt
2016 in France
Accidents and incidents involving the Airbus A320
Aviation accidents and incidents in 2016
Aviation accidents and incidents in the Mediterranean Sea
Airliner accidents and incidents caused by in-flight fires
Airliner accidents and incidents caused by pilot error
804
May 2016 events in Egypt
May 2016 events in Africa 
Egypt–France relations